Staroburnovo (İśke Burnı) is a rural locality (a selo) and the administrative centre of Burnovsky Selsoviet, Birsky District, Bashkortostan, Russia. The population was 862 as of 2010. There are 12 streets.

Geography 
Staroburnovo is located 7 km northeast of Birsk (the district's administrative centre) by road. Novoburnovo is the nearest rural locality.

References 

Rural localities in Birsky District